Charles Sprague Beightler (January 12, 1898 – August 19, 1982) served in the United States Navy, commanding vessels during World War II in the Pacific, and ultimately achieving the rank of rear admiral.

Early life
Beightler was born in Marysville, Ohio, the son of William P. Beightler, President of the Perfect Cigar Company, and Joana Sprague, daughter of Franklin B. Sprague. His brothers were Robert S. Beightler and Donald,
father of Dr. Charles S. Beightler.

College and military
In 1916, he enrolled at the Ohio State University and was a member of the freshmen basketball squad and Alpha Sigma fraternity. Later that year he left the university and enrolled at the United States Naval Academy in Annapolis. He would graduate with the class of 1920 having achieved the rank of Midshipmen.

By 1924 he was a Lieutenant instructing on the USS Farquhar in Florida, and by 1926 he training at the Great Lakes Station.

World War II
During World War II, he would command the USS Electra from June 23, 1943 – September 20, 1944, and USS Rawlins from November 11, 1944 – April 1, 1946 in the Pacific Theater, earning a Bronze Star for extraordinary achievement.

Personal life
He was married to Bonita Pennicke (January 28, 1901 – May 31, 1981), a United States Naval Nurse. He died on August 19, 1982 in El Cajon, California, and is interred at Arlington National Cemetery.

References

1898 births
1982 deaths
People from Marysville, Ohio
United States Navy rear admirals (upper half)
United States Navy personnel of World War II
Burials at Arlington National Cemetery
United States Naval Academy alumni